Bryolymnia marti is a moth of the family Noctuidae first described by Richard Holland in 2010. It is found from central New Mexico and east-central Arizona southward to Durango in northern Mexico.

The length of the forewings is 11–12 mm. Adults have been collected between early June and early July in conifer forests.

Etymology
The species is named in honor of Marti Romero, who first collected the species and was extremely helpful in collecting most of the type series.

External links

Hadeninae
Moths described in 2010